On the Water is a 2020 Estonian drama film directed by Peeter Simm. It was selected as the Estonian entry for the Best International Feature Film at the 94th Academy Awards.

Plot
In 1982, a teenager living with his grandparents comes of age in rural Soviet Estonia.

Cast
 Rasmus Ermel as Andres
 Evelin Võigemast as Andres' mother
 Maria Klenskaja as Andres' grandmother
 Kalju Orro as Andres' grandfather
 Aurora Aleksandra Künnapas as Maria
 Marko Matvere as Valter
 Aarne Soro as Kolla
 Guido Kangur as Hiirekõrv
 Hilje Murel as Selma
 Liisa Aibel as Erika
 Anne Reemann as Püssa Helgi
 Terje Pennie as Manda
 Andres Lepik as Kalju
 Indrek Taalmaa as Liiva Heino
 Kärt Kross-Merilo as Henri's Mother
 Meelis Rämmeld as Fisherman

See also
 List of submissions to the 94th Academy Awards for Best International Feature Film
 List of Estonian submissions for the Academy Award for Best International Feature Film

References

External links
 

2020 films
2020 drama films
Estonian drama films
Estonian-language films
Films set in 1982